David & Fatima is a 2008 drama film about a Palestinian woman and Israeli man from Jerusalem who fall in love. The film is a retelling of William Shakespeare's Romeo & Juliet, and was directed by Alain Zaloum, and stars Cameron Van Hoy, Danielle Pollack, Merik Tadros, Anthony Batarse, Ismail Kanater, Sasha Knopf, John Bryant Davila, Ben Kermode, Allan Kolman, Tony Curtis and Martin Landau. This was the last fictional movie Tony Curtis starred in.

The film encourages Arab Israeli peace.

Development
Kari Bian the executive producer and one of the writers, is an Iranian American living in Malibu, California. He recalled that he encountered hostility during a visit to Israel. Tavia Dautartas, the other producer, is also a Malibu resident. Alain Zaloum, the director and the other writer, is a Cairo-born Copt who during childhood moved to Canada. He had graduated from the film school of the University of Southern California (USC). Bian selected Zaloum because Zaloum was neither Jewish nor was he Muslim, since Bian did not want to give favoritism to either side of the Israeli-Palestinian conflict. Zaloum was the seventh director that had been hired; the producers fired the previous six choices for director. Richard Francis-Bruce did editing work.

Production
The film was almost completely shot in Los Angeles, and shooting took place for five weeks. Tim Worman, the art director, developed areas to appear like the film's settings. Some exterior shots were actually made in Israel. Dialect coaches trained the actors. In addition the actors read history texts about the conflict region. The film's budget was $600,000 ($ adjusted for inflation).

Cast
Americans portrayed almost all of the major characters.
 Cameron Van Hoy as David Isaac
 Van Hoy, who is not Jewish, directly applied for the acting role instead of using an agent.
 Danielle Pollack as Fatima Aziz
 Pollack, a Jewish woman who originates from New York, is not an Arab. Seth Frantzman of The Jerusalem Post wrote that few Arab women portrayed fictional Arab females in similar films. Her role as Fatima was her first professional film job. Despite her inexperience, Van Hoy gave the filmmakers the suggestion of using Pollack; As part of her research she put on a hijab and went shopping at a supermarket to absorb how others around her reacted.
 Martin Landau as Rabbi Schmulic
 Allan Kolman as Benny Isaac
 Anthony Batarse as Ishmael Aziz
 Yareli Arizmendi as Aiida Aziz
 Colette Kilroy as Sarah Isaac, David's mother
 Kilroy originates from Malibu
 Tony Curtis as Mr. Schwartz
 Merik Tadros as Hassan Faraj
 Sascha Knopf as Tami Isaac
 Ben Kermode as Avi Weinstein
 Michael Yavnielli as IDF Recruitment Officer
 Joey Naber as Christian Priest
 Ismail Kanater as Imam
 John Bryant Davila as IDF Soldier
 Alim Kouliev as 	Moroccan Restaurant Patron, as  Ishmael Aziz (Voice Over the Russian Language)

Accuracy
Frantzman wrote that the film's depiction of the Israeli Defense Force (IDF) was "accurate", "gritty", and "sometimes unflattering". He added that Beit Hanina an Arab doctor's house in real life would be more luxurious than the one the film portrays; in addition Frantzman stated that in Jerusalem he had never encountered a bellydancing restaurant like one portrayed in the film and he did not believe such a restaurant existed.

Release
A screening at the Laemmle 4-Plex Theater in Santa Monica, California was scheduled to run until July 25, 2008. The filmmakers intended to distribute the film throughout the United States and in Israel. There are subtitles available in Arabic, Hebrew, and Persian.

Reception
During the Napa Sonoma Wine Country Film Festival the film received the Robert and Margrit Mondavi Award for Peace and Cultural Understanding.

Frantzman wrote that because ordinary Israelis prefer American films and the upper class prefers "self-critical" films, David & Fatima "received almost no attention in Israel".

Gary Goldstein of the Los Angeles Times criticized the "somewhat ersatz quality" that he says originates from the casting of Americans who made "a jumble of imprecise accents that makes one long for native speech and English subtitles."

Frantzman himself concluded "David and Fatima presents an honest story, but one that also doesn't work in the end."

References

Further reading
 Binenfeld, Molly. "Film about interfaith lovers takes Shakespearian turn" (Archive). Jewish Journal. July 23, 2008.

External links
 
 "David & Fatima (2008)" 60 Second Trailer in Persian – Internet Archive

2008 films
2008 romantic drama films
Modern adaptations of works by William Shakespeare
2000s English-language films
American interfaith romance films
Islamic and Jewish interfaith dialogue
Israeli–Palestinian conflict films
Fictional couples
Films based on Romeo and Juliet
American romantic drama films
Films about interracial romance
2000s American films